The Sturgeon-Weir River is a river in east-central Saskatchewan, Canada. It was on the main voyageur route from eastern Canada northeast to the Mackenzie River basin. The river is a popular wilderness canoe route in Canada.

Description

The river's source is Corneille Lake, near the community of Pelican Narrows. It travels southeast, crossing Saskatchewan Highway 106 before reaching Amisk Lake. It then continues southeasterly to Sturgeon Landing and Namew Lake.  It runs through the Churchill River Uplands ecoregion which is located along the southern edge of the Precambrian Shield. The area contains continuous coniferous and boreal forest, consisting of closed stands of black spruce and jack pine  and a ground cover of mosses and lichens. Local relief rarely exceeds 25 m, but there are ridged steeply sloping rocky uplands and lowlands with exposed bedrock throughout. Wildlife includes barren-ground caribou, moose, black bear, lynx, wolf, beaver, muskrat, snowshoe hare and red-backed vole. Bird species include raven, common loon, spruce grouse, bald eagle, Canada jay, hawk owl, and waterfowl, including ducks and geese. Trapping, hunting, fishing, and tourism are occasional uses of land in this region.

History

The river is a historically important route connecting the Saskatchewan and Churchill River systems. It has been used since prehistoric times and archeological digs have uncovered pottery dating to 1100 CE. The first European to explore the river may have been Hudson's Bay Company fur trader Isaac Batt in the winter of 1766–67. In 1776, Alexander Henry with Joseph Frobisher, Thomas Frobisher, and J. B. Cadotte travelled up the river from Cumberland House and established a fort at the river's outlet from Amisk Lake, called Fort Beaver Lake. This became the preferred fur trade route connecting the Saskatchewan River system to northern Canada. It linked the important trading posts of Cumberland House to the Frog Portage, Île-à-la-Crosse and eventually Lake Athabasca. However, its steep gradient (about 4 feet per mile) led voyageurs to call it the Rivière Maligne or Bad River. A traveller in the early 19th century recorded "This river is most appropriately named by the Canadians; for I believe, for its length, it is the most dangerous, cross-grained piece of navigation in the Indian country." The explorer Sir Alexander Mackenzie described it as "an almost continual rapid".

In 1779 Philip Turnor was the first to note it on a map as a "river leading northward and upon the back of the Churchill." Its route was first recorded (unnamed) on an Aaron Arrowsmith map published in 1802. David Thompson recorded its length and named it "Sturgeon Weir River" in his 1814 map of the North-West Territory.

See also
Amisk Lake
List of rivers of Saskatchewan

References

Division No. 18, Unorganized, Saskatchewan
Rivers of Saskatchewan
Tributaries of Hudson Bay